The second and final season of Mi marido tiene familia, a Mexican telenovela produced by Juan Osorio, was ordered on 18 October 2017. The season premiered on Las Estrellas on 9 July 2018 and ended on 24 February 2019.

Plot 
Julieta (Zuria Vega) and Robert (Daniel Arenas) have to divide their time between being parents, being children, being siblings and fulfilling in their work, but above all not losing their communication as a couple. Everything will get complicated for Julieta, when her new boss Susana (Susana González) arrives, who will face the dilemma of many women: balance her role as mother, wife and professional. For his part, Robert will discover that he has other relatives, so that Julieta's political family will increase and also the conflicts with the other members of the Córcega family.

Cast

Main 
 Zuria Vega as Julieta Aguilar
 Daniel Arenas as Robert Cooper / Juan Pablo
 Diana Bracho as Blanca Gómez de Córcega
 Arath de la Torre as Pancho López
 Susana González as Susana Córcega Díaz
 Carmen Salinas as Crisanta Díaz
 Silvia Pinal as Imelda Sierra de Córcega
 Gabriel Soto as Ernesto "Neto" Rey

Recurring and guest 

 Rafael Inclán as Eugenio Córcega
 Patricio Castillo as Massimo
 Juan Diego Covarrubias as Carlos Rojas
 René Casados as Audifaz Córcega
 Olivia Bucio as Catalina Rivera
 Regina Orozco as Amalia Gómez
 Carlos Bracho as Canuto Córcega Rodríguez
 Laura Vignati as Daniela Córcega
 José Pablo Minor as Gabriel Musi
 Violeta Isfel as Clarissa
 Jade Fraser as Linda Córcega
 Gaby Platas as Amapola Casteñeda
 Emilio Osorio as Aristóteles Córcega
 Bárbara Islas as Diana Mejía
 Cecilia Gabriela as Tania
 Ana Jimena Villanueva as Cassandra
 Gonzalo Vega Jr. as Axel Legorreta Córcega
 Germán Bracco as Guido
 Ignacio Casano as Hugo Aguilar
 Marco Muñoz as Tulio Córcega
 Isabella Tena as Frida Meneses
 Marcos Montero as Ignacio Meneses
 Luis Gerardo Cuburu as Octavio
 Latin Lover as Enzo
 Carlos Madrigal as Vicente Legorreta
 Susy Lu as Aura
 Paola Archer as Eréndira
 Jessidey León as Zenda
 Rodrigo Pérez as Sebastián
 Ruy Rodrigo as David
 Salvador Ibarra as Fernando
 Alex Rosguer as Iker
 Azúl Guaita as Yolotl Rey
 José Pablo Alanís as Andy Rey
 José Manuel Alanís as Santi Rey
 Pietro Vannucci as Luigi
 Carla Carrillo as Grecia
 Joaquín Bondoni as Cuauhtémoc "Temo" López
 Nikolás Caballero as Diego
 Alisson Coronado as Ana Lupe "Lupita" López Treviño
 Emiliano Vázquez as Julio López Treviño
 Romina Marcos as Sasha
 Roberto González as Lázaro
 Santiago Zenteno as Lic. Eduardo Rey
 Arturo Guízar as Ruffo
 Gala de la Torre as Gala
 Karla Gómez as Ariana
 Mayrín Villanueva as Rebeca Treviño (guest stars)

Episodes

References

External links
 

2018 Mexican television seasons
2019 Mexican television seasons